Garry Williams (born 17 November 1956) is  a former Australian rules footballer who played with South Melbourne and St Kilda in the Victorian Football League (VFL).

Notes

External links 
		

Living people
1956 births
Australian rules footballers from Victoria (Australia)
Sydney Swans players
St Kilda Football Club players
Casey Demons players